Sheremetyevskaya may refer to:

 Natalia Brasova, also known as Natalia Sergeyevna Sheremetyevskaya
 Sheremetyevskaya (Moscow Metro), station of the Bolshaya Koltsevaya line